Sumburgh Head is a headland located at the southern tip of the Shetland Mainland in northern Scotland. The head consists of a 100 m high rocky spur and topped by the Sumburgh Head Lighthouse. In the Old Norse language, Sumburgh Head was called Dunrøstar høfdi, it means "The Head onto the loud tide-race", referring to the noise of Sumburgh Roost. Robert Stevenson was the engineer in charge of building the Sumburgh Head lighthouse. Work started on the building in 1819, and the light was first lit in 1821.

Local ecology
The area is now recognized as a nature reserve by the Royal Society for the Protection of Birds. The cliffs are home to large numbers of seabirds with 33,000 puffins being estimated in the year 2000. These numbers have declined sharply: for example only 570 of the birds were counted in 2017. The decline in Puffin numbers also appears to apply to other species native to Sumburgh Head. In  as birds, Sumburgh Head has become a popular viewing point for whales and dolphins.

Nearby locations
Sumburgh Airport, which takes its name from the head, lies immediately to the north, and serves as the main airport for the Shetland Islands. Flights from here connect to mainland Scotland, the Orkney Islands and Norway. Also close to the Sumburgh Head is the archaeological site of Jarlshof, at which a series of settlements existed dating back to the neolithic period.

References

External links 

 
 Images from around Sumburgh

Special Protection Areas in Scotland
Sites of Special Scientific Interest in Shetland
Headlands of Scotland
Protected areas of Shetland
Royal Society for the Protection of Birds reserves in Scotland
Landforms of Shetland
Mainland, Shetland